The Rural Municipality of Aberdeen No. 373 is a rural municipality (RM) in the Canadian province of Saskatchewan within Census Division No. 15 and  Division No. 5. It is located on the South Saskatchewan River.

History 
The RM of Aberdeen No. 373 incorporated as a rural municipality on December 13, 1909.

Heritage properties
There is one historical building located within the rural municipality, the St. Paul's Bergheim Evangelical Lutheran Church constructed in 1919 by early immigrants from Germany. The church is located on a 12-hectare parcel of land on Bergheim Road. The church is still in use.

Geography

Communities and localities 
The following urban municipalities are surrounded by the RM.

Towns
Aberdeen

The following unincorporated communities are within the RM.

Localities
Clarkboro
Edenburg
Laniwci
Strawberry Hills

Demographics 

Economy 
Major employers in the RM include the Dreyfus Inland Grain Terminal (near CN line), Horizon Seed Processors pulse crop facility (also near the CN line) and the Hold On Industries manufacturing facility. The area economy is dominated by agriculture.

Government 
The RM of Aberdeen No. 373 is governed by an elected municipal council and an appointed administrator that meets on the second Thursday of every month. The reeve of the RM is Martin Bettker while its administrator is Gordon Craig Baird. The RM's office is located in Aberdeen.

Transportation 
Rail
CNR—Winnipeg-Edmonton Main Line—serves Vonda, Aberdeen, Clarkboro, Warman.

Roads
As the RM is responsible for snow removal, upkeep and repair in conjunction with the provincial highway department, these are the main Saskatchewan highways served by Aberdeen No. 373.
Highway 27—serves Vonda to Aberdeen
Highway 41—serves Alvena to Saskatoon
Highway 784—Highway 4 to Highway 41 near Aberdeen
Highway 785—Highway 12 to Highway 41 near Aberdeen

References

External links 

A
Division No. 15, Saskatchewan